James Maddison (9 November 1924 – 7 June 1992) was an English footballer who scored 63 goals from 412 appearances in the Football League playing at outside left for Middlesbrough, Darlington, Grimsby Town and Chesterfield. He went on to play non-league football for clubs including Cambridge City. His season at Cambridge City saw his first team opportunities limited and he spent most of the season playing for the reserves in the Eastern Counties League.

References

1924 births
1992 deaths
Footballers from South Shields
English footballers
Association football wingers
Middlesbrough F.C. players
Darlington F.C. players
Grimsby Town F.C. players
Chesterfield F.C. players
Cambridge City F.C. players
English Football League players
Southern Football League players